José Orlando Pérez Moguel (born 28 January 1965) is a Mexican politician affiliated with the National Action Party. As of 2014 he served as Deputy of the LIX Legislature of the Mexican Congress representing Yucatán, and previously served in the LV Legislature of the Congress of Yucatán.

References

1965 births
Living people
Politicians from Yucatán (state)
National Action Party (Mexico) politicians
Instituto Tecnológico Autónomo de México alumni
Members of the Congress of Yucatán
20th-century Mexican politicians
21st-century Mexican politicians
Deputies of the LIX Legislature of Mexico
Members of the Chamber of Deputies (Mexico) for Yucatán